The José Miguel Agrelot Coliseum of Puerto Rico is the biggest indoor arena in Puerto Rico dedicated to entertainment. It is located at the Golden Mile of San Juan, the island capital. It is usually referred by Puerto Ricans as the Choliseo, which is a portmanteau of the words "Coliseo" and "Cholito", in reference to Don Cholito, one of José Miguel Agrelot's characters and Agrelot's own adopted nickname.

The following is a list of noteworthy public events that have taken place at the venue since its opening.

2004–2006

Debuts in Puerto Rico
Van Halen: September 13, 2004
Andrea Bocelli: November 19, 2004
Juanes: February 26–27, 2005
Hilary Duff: November 13, 2005
Nelly Furtado: October 29, 2005
The Black Eyed Peas: November 17, 2005
RBD: December 4, 2005
Ringling Bros. and Barnum & Bailey Circus: December 14–18, 2005
Usher, Lil Jon, Ludacris, Fat Joe, Beyoncé: April 4–5, 2006

Debuts at the venue
Roberto Roena and his Apollo Sound, Papo Lucca and La Sonora Ponceña, Richie Ray & Bobby Cruz: September 4, 2004
Draco Rosa: September 18, 2004
Daddy Yankee: December 18, 2004
Megadeth: October 15, 2005
Tommy Torres, Ricardo Montaner, Sin Bandera, Ednita Nazario: October 29, 2005
La Secta Allstar : December 2, 2005
Ricky Martin: February 18–19, 2006
Luis Fonsi: April 7, 2006
Ana Gabriel: May 12, 2006
Gustavo Cerati: August 3, 2006. His first and only performance at the venue before his death.
Laura Pausini: August 16, 2006
R.K.M & Ken-Y: August 18, 2006. First sold-out performance of the duo.
Chayanne: October 28, 2006
Aerosmith, Vivanativa: November 26, 2006

Debuts as headliner
Artists who debuted at the venue as the main act, after having previously performed as part of a group, band or as a guest artist.
La Secta Allstar: December 2, 2005
Sting: April 27, 2006

Events
September 4, 2004: Grand opening of the venue.
January 9, 2005 (WWE New Year's Revolution 2005): second globally-broadcast WWE pay-per-view event held outside the United States or Canada (following SummerSlam at Wembley Stadium in 1992). First pay-per-view event held at the venue.
October 15, 2005 (Megadeth): first heavy metal concert held at the venue.
December 2, 2005 (La Secta Allstar): First Puerto Rican band to perform at the venue.
February 11, 2006 (The Rolling Stones): established gross ticket sales record for a single show with $3.1 million.
April 4–5, 2006 (Usher): concert performances filmed and broadcast for his live Showtime special One Night, One Star: Usher Live.
June 6, 2006 (Ricardo Arjona): 1 millionth visitor.
August 26, 2006 (AF2 Championship): one of the few professional arena football games played on the island and the first at the venue.
September 23, 2006 (NHL): first and only professional hockey game on the island.
September 29–30, 2006 (Marc Anthony): two free-admission concert dates for the filming of El Cantante, which needed an audience.

2007–2009

Debuts in Puerto Rico
Elton John: April 28, 2007. His first and only performance in Puerto Rico before his retirement.
Papa Roach: November 29, 2007
Il Divo: December 16, 2007
Camila: June 7, 2008
Demi Lovato: December 21, 2008
Celine Dion: January 31, 2009
Honor Society: March 22, 2009
Coheed & Cambria: June 12, 2009
The Killers: November 11, 2009

Debuts at the venue
Jowell & Randy: June 2, 2007
Ivy Queen: November 30, 2007
Rod Stewart: August 30, 2008
Jonas Brothers: March 22, 2009

Debuts as headliner
Artists who debuted at the venue as the main act, after having previously performed as part of a group, band or as a guest artist.
Tommy Torres: January 24, 2009

Events
April 2–6, 2008 (Disney on Ice): 2 millionth visitor. First ice-skating rink event held at the venue.
April 27, 2008 (Popular Democratic Party of Puerto Rico): first political assembly held at the venue.
December 4–10, 2008 (Aventura): most of their performances were sold out and became the band/artist to have sold more than three straight concert dates at the venue. This record would later be broken by Wisin & Yandel exactly ten years later.
June 19, 2009 (University of Puerto Rico at Río Piedras): first ceremony of bestowing of degrees celebrated at the venue.
September 4, 2009 (ECW/WWE SmackDown): fifth anniversary of the venue.
October 10, 2009 (Gloria Estefan): 3 millionth visitor.

2010–2012

Debuts in Puerto Rico
Paul McCartney: April 5, 2010. First member of The Beatles to perform in Puerto Rico.
Thirty Seconds to Mars: May 22, 2011
Bruno Mars: September 8, 2011
Evanescence: October 6, 2011
Cirque du Soleil: October 19–23, 2011
Britney Spears: December 10, 2011
Enrique Bunbury: March 29, 2012
Il Volo: April 28, 2012
Andre Agassi, Pete Sampras: May 22, 2010
Big Time Rush: August 26, 2012
Lady Gaga: October 30–31, 2012
Michel Telo: November 2, 2012
Creed: December 8, 2012

Debuts at the venue
Yolandita Monge: September 11, 2010
Pitbull: November 2, 2012

Debuts as headliner
Artists who debuted at the venue as the main act, after having previously performed as part of a group, band or as a guest artist.
Natalia Jiménez: March 10, 2012
Jesse & Joy: October 27, 2012

Events
March 14, 2010 (Metallica): fastest-selling concert at the venue and all of Puerto Rico and largest attendance for an arena stage concert with 17,286 spectators. This record would later be broken by Bad Bunny in March 2019 and again in July 2022.
April 29, 2010 (2010 Billboard Latin Music Awards): first time the awards show is held outside the United States. First awards show held at the venue.
May 22, 2010 (Andre Agassi vs. Pete Sampras): first tennis match at the venue.
January 29, 2011–August 15, 2011: Enrique Iglesias, Ricky Martin, Maná and Juan Luis Guerra began their respective 2011 world tours in Puerto Rico.
June 17, 2011 (Maná): 4 millionth visitor.
October 14, 2011–December 10, 2011: Shakira, Ricky Martin, Avenged Sevenfold and Britney Spears concluded their respective world tours in Puerto Rico.
March 30–31, 2012 (Draco Rosa): marked his comeback after almost a year in cancer treatment.
May 4–6, 2012 (Ednita Nazario): artist with the most number of shows performed at the venue. This record would later be broken by Wisin & Yandel in December 2018 and again in December 2022.

2013–2015

Debuts in Puerto Rico
Hillsong United: October 7, 2013
Justin Bieber: October 19, 2013
Óptimo: November 22, 2013
Jerry Seinfeld: March 8, 2014
Miley Cyrus: September 11, 2014
Ringo Starr & His All-Starr Band: February 22, 2015. Second and final member of The Beatles to perform in Puerto Rico.
Imagine Dragons: April 23, 2015
Katy Perry: October 12, 2015
Monster Jam: November 6–8, 2015

Debuts at the venue
Luis Raúl: September 14, 2013. First stand-up comedian to perform at the venue and final stand-up of his career, before his death.
Cafe Tacuba: September 21, 2013
Fania All-Stars: October 18, 2013
Atención Atención: March 23, 2014. Group's first sold-out concert as well as the first and only children's music group to debut at the venue.
Farruko: March 29, 2014
Tempo: May 17, 2014. Marked his stage return after completing his community work sentence.
Cosculluela: September 19, 2014
Beyond The Sun: October 18, 2014
Zoé: October 25, 2014
Bret Michaels: April 25, 2015
Pedro Capó: June 5, 2015
Juan Gabriel: March 1, 2015. Marked his final return to Puerto Rico after nearly 22 years of absence, before his death.

Debuts as headliner
Artists who debuted at the venue as the main act, after having previously performed as part of a group, band or as a guest artist.
Richie Ray & Bobby Cruz: February 2, 2013
Romeo Santos: February 14–15, 2013
Pablo Alborán: February 16, 2013
Antonio Orozco: May 11, 2013
Víctor Manuelle: May 25, 2013
Cano Estremera: August 17, 2013
Beyoncé: September 28, 2013
Gilberto Santa Rosa: February 8, 2014
Prince Royce: March 7, 2014
La Sonora Ponceña: May 25, 2014
Yandel: October 4, 2014
Plan B: November 14, 2014
Wisin: December 5, 2014
Zion & Lennox: February 7–8, 2015
Tito el Bambino: March 13, 2015
Christine D'Clario: March 28, 2015
Charlie Aponte: June 6, 2015. Solo debut after departing El Gran Combo de Puerto Rico.
Alex Zurdo: June 7, 2015
Nick Jonas: August 9, 2015. First performance in Puerto Rico as a solo artist.
Tego Calderón: August 28, 2015
Nicky Jam: September 17–18, 2015
De La Ghetto: November 13, 2015

Events
May 3, 2013 (Don Omar): 5 millionth visitor. Marks the return of Don Omar to the venue after five years since his last concert there.
September 1, 2013 (Bruno Mars): breaks record attendance at the venue, previously held by Aventura, with 16,691 spectators.
September 14, 2013 (Luis Raúl): first stand-up comedy show at the venue, first show livestreamed over the Internet. His stand-up performance was made into a posthumous film, as per his last wishes.
October 18, 2013 (Fania All-Stars): first show in Puerto Rico in more than 15 years since their last on the island. Premiered the first holographic projection on the island, "reviving" Héctor Lavoe and dancer Aníbal Vazquez, uncle of Roberto Roena.
February 15, 2014 (Amor en la Hamaca): first Puerto Rican play to debut at the venue.
June 27, 2014 (JuvenFilm Fest): first local film awards, recognizing short films created, produced and starred by youth of the public education system.
September 4, 2014: tenth anniversary of the venue.
April 11, 2015 (Orlando Salido vs. Rocky Martinez): first boxing match at the venue in nearly five years.
June 20, 2015 (Def Leppard): marked the return of the band to Puerto Rico after nine years of absence.
May 23, 2015 (Camila and Reik): marked the return to Puerto Rico of both bands after four years of absence and the first presentation of Camila in Puerto Rico after the departure of Samo from the group.
December 3, 2015 (Daddy Yankee and Don Omar): first performance of both artists together after years of dispute. The first concert date sold out in less than 24 hours, setting a new sales record at the venue. The second concert date sells out completely in less than 12 hours, breaking the sales record set for the first concert date.

2016–2018

Debuts in Puerto Rico
CNCO: February 12–14, 2016
Fall Out Boy: February 25, 2016
Huey Lewis and The News: March 4, 2016
Rafael Nadal, Víctor Estrella Burgos: March 21, 2016
Anthrax: April 28, 2016
Panic! at the Disco: October 28, 2016
Maluma: November 19, 2016
Ed Sheeran: June 4, 2017
OneRepublic: June 11, 2017

Debuts at the venue
Madonna: January 27–28, 2016. Marks her return to Puerto Rico after twenty two years of absence.
Sie7e: February 6, 2016
Baby Rasta & Gringo: March 5, 2016
Fiel a la Vega: October 15, 2016
Julieta Venegas: September 10, 2016
Puerto Rico Philharmonic Orchestra: November 20, 2016
J Balvin: March 8, 2017
Arcángel & De La Ghetto: April 28, 2017
Jorge Pabón "Molusco": May 20–21, 2017
Jarabe de Palo: August 19, 2017
Ozuna: September 15, 2017
Phil Collins: March 27, 2018
Camila Cabello: October 23, 2018. First performance in Puerto Rico as a solo artist.

Debuts as headliner
Artists who debuted at the venue as the main act, after having previously performed as part of a group, band or as a guest artist.
Willie Colón: November 12, 2016
CNCO: April 22, 2017

Events
April 8, 2016 (Sin Bandera): marks the duo's return to the venue after almost nine years since their last performance, before their split.
April 29, 2016 (Duran Duran): marks the band's return to Puerto Rico in ten years.
September 17, 2016 (Laura Pausini): marks the singer's return to Puerto Rico in ten years.
October 1, 2016 (Richie Ray & Bobby Cruz): marks the retirement of the duo.
November 20, 2016 (Puerto Rico Philharmonic Orchestra): marks the debut of the first philharmonic orchestra to perform at the venue.
April 28, 2017 (Arcángel & De La Ghetto): marks the duo's reunion and their debut at the venue.
May 13, 2017 (Ednita Nazario): marked the 1,000th event held at the venue and the artist's 15th performance at the venue.
May 20–21, 2017 (Jorge Pabón "Molusco"): marked the second time a stand-up comedy event was held at the venue by a Puerto Rican comedian. Also marked his debut at the venue to a sold-out two-date performance.
September–December 2017: after the hit from Hurricane Maria, in the 2017 Atlantic hurricane season, events after mid September 2017 were cancelled. The Choliseo was used as a warehouse and recollection center by the Government of Puerto Rico in order to prepare and distribute food, water and basic necessities to those affected by the deadliest and costliest hurricane in Puerto Rican history.
March 27, 2018 (Phil Collins): marked the first sold-out concert at the venue since the hit of Hurricane Maria, which devastated Puerto Rico in September 2017.
June–August 2018: Wisin & Yandel announce their first headlining tour since their five-year hiatus to take place at the venue in December 2018. Between June and August 2018, the duo managed to sell out a record-breaking 8-show headlining run at the venue; the first two shows sold out in record time in pre-sales.
October 2018: Bad Bunny's first concert date, for March 8, 2019, sells out in a record two hours, the first for a Choliseo debut for any artist at the venue, who has had previous performances in Puerto Rico.
November 30–December 9, 2018: Wisin & Yandel becomes the artist/duo with most performances at the Choliseo, previously held by Ednita Nazario, as well as the artist/duo with the most record-breaking sold-out dates than any other artist that has performed at the venue with 25, previously held by Aventura. They also broke the record of the highest number of tickets sold by any artist at the venue with 312,000 in a span of 15 years, since the venue first opened.

2019–2021

Debuts in Puerto Rico
Sarah Brightman: January 17, 2019
Marvel Universe Live!: May 29–June 2, 2019
César Millán: June 8, 2019

Debuts at the venue
Rauw Alejandro: May 16, 2020
In The Heights: September 16–26, 2021
Karol G: November 27–28, 2021

Debuts as headliner
Artists who debuted at the venue as the main act, after having previously performed as part of a group, band or as a guest artist.
Bad Bunny: March 8–10, 2019

Events
March 9, 2019 (Bad Bunny): a new attendance record was broken with 18,000 spectators in an arena stage concert, a record previously held by Metallica nearly nine years prior. This record would again be broken by the singer in July 2022.
March 21, 2019: Telemundo debuts Premios Tu Música Urbano at the Choliseo and the venue becomes its permanent host. It is the third awards show held at the venue.
September 4, 2019: fifteenth anniversary of the venue.
September–December 2019: Daddy Yankee sells out 12 record-breaking dates between December 5–29, which marked his return to the Choliseo since his last headlining concert in 2005.
March 2020–June 2021: due to the ongoing impact of the COVID-19 pandemic on the entertainment and the music industry, events at the venue have been either been cancelled until further notice or moved to a later date.
May 16, 2020 (Rauw Alejandro): amid the worldwide COVID-19 pandemic, and after many major events at the venue were cancelled or postponed, Rauw Alejandro held a live concert at the Choliseo with no audience and livestreamed it over the Internet. His performance was originally scheduled for March 2020 at the Coca-Cola Music Hall but was cancelled due to the pandemic.
May 20, 2021: after over a year since the COVID-19 pandemic impacted operations of the Choliseo, Governor Pedro Pierluisi announced major events at entertainment venues will be permitted to take place at an increased capacity, including the Choliseo. The announcement was made at the venue as part of many other modifications made to the existing executive order placed by his predecessor when the pandemic began.
 June 26, 2021 (Gilberto Santa Rosa): first public event at the Choliseo since the coronavirus pandemic began. The venue reopened to modified capacity as per the most recently-updated executive order for entertainment venues.
September 16–26, 2021 (In The Heights): first musical theater production held at the venue, with an all-star Puerto Rican cast led by Ektor Rivera.
December 10–11, 2021 (Bad Bunny): "P FKN R: The Ultimate Experience" was the first time a concert was presented via livestream at the Choliseo, while it was simultaneously being held in person at the Hiram Bithorn Stadium, less than two miles away from the venue. Bad Bunny would later appear in person at the Choliseo that same night to perform additional songs for the attendees.

2022–2023

Debuts at the venue
Sech: April 10, 2022

Debuts as headliner
Artists who debuted at the venue as the main act, after having previously performed as part of a group, band or as a guest artist.
Myke Towers: April 20–22, 2022

Events
July 21, 2022 (2022 Premios Juventud): first time the awards show is held outside the United States. Fourth awards show held at the venue.
July 28, 2022 (Bad Bunny): the singer establishes an all-time Choliseo attendance record of 18,749 spectators on the first night of his three-night performances, breaking a 2019 record by him as well. This new one was just shy of 51 spectators of the venue's capacity. This was the first time a concert was live-broadcast on national television in Puerto Rico, which was exclusively through the airwaves of Telemundo Puerto Rico.
December 3–31, 2022 (Wisin & Yandel): the duo breaks various new records, some they've held as well. They headline the Choliseo for a 14-date run for the entire month of December 2022, a record previously held by Daddy Yankee, who had a 12-date run, December 2019. They again break their own record for most performances by an artist/duo at the Choliseo, increasing it to 39. Out of the duo's concert dates, nine shows were sold out in 24 hours, another record they previously broke. Their final concert date, December 31, 2022, marks the first time a concert is held at the Choliseo for New Year's Eve. This run marks the end of their final concert tour, La Última Misión, intended to be their farewell tour.
May 5–6, 2023 (WWE): two professional wrestling events, WWE SmackDown and Backlash 2023, will take place at the venue for the first time since New Year's Revolution 2005. It will also be the first time the venue hosts back-to-back WWE events.

References

Lists of events in Puerto Rico
San Juan, Puerto Rico-related lists
Lists of events by venue